Niroshan Illeperuma (Sinhala: නිරෝෂන් ඉලේපෙරුම) was one of Sri Lanka's popular actors and teledrama directors.

Early life and education

Niroshan was educated at Nalanda College Colombo.

Career
Niroshan is also the managing director of Channel One Six television channel of PEO TV.

Teledrama Directing
Niroshan's debut as director with a tele drama is titled Sihina Aran Enna casting Chathurika Peiris, Bimal Jayakody, Roshan Pilapitiya, Namel Weeramuni, Kamal Deshapriya and others.

Acting
Niroshan had been cast in Angana, Sadisi Tharanaya, Wasanavewa etc. to name a few.

References 

 

 

 

 

Sri Lankan male film actors
Sinhalese male actors
Sri Lankan Buddhists
Alumni of Nalanda College, Colombo